Audrey is a 1916 American silent drama film produced by Famous Players Film Company and released through Paramount Pictures. The film stars Pauline Frederick and was directed by Robert G. Vignola. It is based on a novel of the same name about an orphan by Mary Johnston. The film is now considered lost.

Cast
 Pauline Frederick - Audrey
 Charles Waldron - Lord Haward
 Margarete Christians - Evelyn Byrd
 E. L. Fernandez - Jean Hugon (as E. Fernandez)
 Helen Lindroth - Mrs. Darden
 Henry Hallam - Mr. Darden
 Jack Clark - John Byrd 
 Rita Connolly - uncredited

See also
List of lost films

References

External links

Audrey at SilentEra

 promotional initial release material(archived)

1916 films
American silent feature films
American black-and-white films
Famous Players-Lasky films
Films about orphans
Films about slavery
Films based on American novels
Films directed by Robert G. Vignola
Films set in the 19th century
1910s historical drama films
American historical drama films
Films shot in Florida
Lost American films
Paramount Pictures films
1916 lost films
Lost drama films
1916 drama films
1910s American films
Silent American drama films